The China Basin Stakes is an ungraded stakes race for three-year-olds and up, run over a distance of eight and a half furlongs on the turf, or one and one/sixteenth mile.  Run each year at Golden Gate Fields, it offers a purse of $55,000.

The race is named for an area of the San Francisco Bay.

Past winners

 2006 - Cummiskey (IRE) (Dennis Carr)

External links
 Golden Gate Fields website

Ungraded stakes races in the United States
Horse races in California
Turf races in the United States
Sports in the San Francisco Bay Area
Golden Gate Fields